Chunta (Aymara for prolonged, lengthened, also spelled Chonta) is a mountain in the Wansu mountain range in the Andes of Peru, about  high. It is located in the Arequipa Region, La Unión Province, Puyca District. It lies south of the river Qumpi Pallqa (Compepalca), northwest of Tintaya and east of Puka Suntu. 

Chunta is also the name of a slightly lower mountain southeast of Tintaya.

References 

Mountains of Arequipa Region